The Indian Maritime University (IMU) is a public central university directly under the Ministry of Ports, Shipping and Waterways, in India. It deals with a wide range of topics related to the sea, ranging from oceanography to maritime law and history, and including practical topics such as search and rescue at sea and the transportation of dangerous goods.It is India's national institute for the training of Merchant navy Officers. It was established by the Indian Maritime University Act 2008, on 14 November 2008.Before the foundation of IMU, there were seven renowned teaching and research institutes under the Ministry of Shipping. Following institutes were subsumed under IMU in 2008.
 National Maritime Academy, Chennai
 T S Chanakya, Mumbai
 Lal Bahadur Shastri College of Advanced Maritime Studies & Research, Mumbai
 Marine Engineering Research Institute, Mumbai
 Marine Engineering Research Institute, Kolkata
 Indian Institute of Port Management, Kolkata
National Ship Design & Research Centre, Visakhapatnam
It has an All-India jurisdiction and the headquarters is at Chennai. It has six campuses in Chennai, Kochi, Kolkata, Mumbai Port, Navi Mumbai, and Visakhapatnam.

Chennai Campus 

Indian Maritime University - Chennai Campus, previously known as National Maritime Academy is located on the outskirts of Chennai. The campus houses the academic block, hostel, residential and recreational facilities.

The academy was established in 1985 with the technical assistance from UNDP / UNCTAD. It is credited with ISO 9001:2000 Certification and accredited as grade 1 rating by ICRA. It has modern facilities to conduct training programmes for both port and marine personnel.

IMU Chennai offers the following academic programs:
 B.Sc., in Nautical Science 
 B.Tech. in Marine Engineering 
 Diploma in Nautical Science 
 MBA in Port and Shipping Management 
 MBA in International Transportation and Logistics Management 
 BBA in Logistics, Retailing and E-Commerce 
 Post Sea / STCW Courses

Affiliated colleges 

Following are list of colleges affiliated under IMU. As of 2018, there were 21 colleges.

References

External links
 

Maritime colleges in India
Central universities in India
Educational institutions established in 2008
2008 establishments in Tamil Nadu
Universities in Chennai
Universities in Tamil Nadu
Universities in Andhra Pradesh
Universities and colleges in Visakhapatnam